The Panama Fed Cup team represents Panama in Fed Cup tennis competition and are governed by the Federación Panamena de Tenis. They have not competed since 2014.

History
Panama competed in its first Fed Cup in 1997.  Their best result was sixth in Group II in 2006.

See also
Fed Cup
Panama Davis Cup team

External links

Billie Jean King Cup teams
Fed Cup
Fed Cup